The President of the Honourable Chamber of Deputies of the Argentine Nation, commonly known simply as the President of the Chamber of Deputies is the presiding officer of the lower house of the National Congress of Argentina, customarily a member of the governing party.

The president  is an elected member of the Chamber who is chosen by the members of the Senate at the outset of each legislative year, which per governing statutes established in 1996, takes place during the first ten days of December. Three Vice Presidents deputise the President, and they are typically elected from minority blocs in the Chamber.

In the country's order of succession, the President of the Chamber of Deputies is third in line should the President of Argentina die, resign, or be otherwise incapacitated, after the Vice President and the Provisional President of the Senate. In all of Argentina's history, only two presidents of the Chamber has ever assumed executive powers in interim fashion: Raúl Lastiri in 1973, and Eduardo Camaño in 2001.

List of presidents

References

External links
Official website of the Argentine Chamber of Deputies (in Spanish)

Lis
Argentina